Ernst-Reinhard Beck (born 31 August 1945 in Stetten am kalten Markt, Baden-Württemberg) is a German politician and member of the conservative CDU.

A secondary school teacher by profession and former principal, Beck was a directly elected member of the Bundestag between 2002 and 2013, serving for the electoral district of Reutlingen.

Beck was spokesman on defense policy for the fraction of the Christian Democrats and chairman of the curators of the Bundeszentrale für politische Bildung.

Beck holds the rank of Colonel (retired) in the Army Reserves of the Bundeswehr. 
He has been president of the Verband der Reservisten der Deutschen Bundeswehr (German Reservist's Association) from 2003 until 2009. 
Beck is married since 1971. His brother Michael Beck is the mayor of Tuttlingen.

Awards and decorations
 Officer of the National Order of Merit (France)
 Knight of the Ordre des Palmes Académiques (France)
 Companion of the National Order of Merit (Malta)
 Bundeswehr Cross of Honour in Gold
 Staufer Medal of Baden-Württemberg
 Golden Badge of Honour of the Association of the German Armed Forces Reservists
 Command Medal of the Second Corps of the Bundeswehr
 2013: Merit Cross on Ribbon (Verdienstkreuz am Bande)

External links 
 Biography by German Bundestag

1945 births
Living people
People from Sigmaringen (district)
Members of the Bundestag for Baden-Württemberg
Officers of the Ordre national du Mérite
Chevaliers of the Ordre des Palmes Académiques
Recipients of the Badge of Honour of the Bundeswehr
Recipients of the Cross of the Order of Merit of the Federal Republic of Germany
Members of the Bundestag 2009–2013
Members of the Bundestag 2005–2009
Members of the Bundestag 2002–2005
Members of the Bundestag for the Christian Democratic Union of Germany
Military personnel from Baden-Württemberg